Damian Munro (born 6 October 1976) is a former professional rugby league footballer who played in the 1990s, 2000s and 2010s.

Playing career

International honours
Damian Munro won a cap for Ireland while at Widnes Vikings 1999 1-cap (sub).

Club career
Damian Munro went from Halifax to Widnes Vikings along with Kevin O'Loughlin, in the deal that took Jamie Bloem from Widnes Vikings to Halifax.

References

External links
Statistics at rugby.widnes.tv

1976 births
Living people
Blackpool Panthers players
English people of Irish descent
English rugby league players
Featherstone Rovers players
Halifax R.L.F.C. players
Ireland national rugby league team players
Leigh Leopards players
Place of birth missing (living people)
Rugby league centres
Rugby league fullbacks
Rugby league wingers
Widnes Vikings players